Łukasz Polański (born January 29, 1989) is a Polish volleyball player, a member of Polish club AZS Częstochowa.

Personal life
Łukasz Polański was born in Warsaw, Poland. In 2013 he married Gabriela (née Wojtowicz), who is also a volleyball player. On December 2, 2013 his wife gave birth to their son Jakub.

Career

Clubs
In 2014 he signed a contract with BBTS Bielsko-Biała.

Sporting achievements

Clubs

National championships
 2012/2013  Polish Championship, with Jastrzębski Węgiel

National team
 2007  CEV U19 European Championship

References

External links
 PlusLiga player profile

1989 births
Living people
Volleyball players from Warsaw
Polish men's volleyball players
Jastrzębski Węgiel players
Effector Kielce players
BBTS Bielsko-Biała players
AZS Częstochowa players